Khush Manzal (also Romanized as Khūsh Manzal) is a village in Jazin Rural District, in the Central District of Bajestan County, Razavi Khorasan Province, Iran. At the 2006 census, its population was 16, in 4 families.

References 

Populated places in Bajestan County